Disambiguation: Cullion (Kinawley)

Cullion railway station served Cullion, County Tyrone in Northern Ireland.

It was opened by the Donegal Railway Company on 6 August 1900. It became an unmanned halt in July 1924.
It closed on 1 January 1955.

Routes

References

Disused railway stations in County Tyrone
Railway stations opened in 1900
Railway stations closed in 1955
Railway stations in Northern Ireland opened in the 20th century